Hyde Park may refer to:

Places

England
 Hyde Park, London, a Royal Park in Central London
 Hyde Park, Leeds, an inner-city area of north-west Leeds
 Hyde Park, Sheffield, district of Sheffield
 Hyde Park, in Hyde, Greater Manchester

Australia
 Hyde Park, Perth, a park in Perth
 Hyde Park, Queensland, a suburb of Townsville
 Hyde Park, South Australia, a suburb of Adelaide
 Hyde Park, Sydney, park in New South Wales

United States
 Hyde Park, Los Angeles, California
 Hyde Park (Tampa), Florida
 Hyde Park, Boise, Idaho, a historic district in Boise's North End neighborhood
 Hyde Park, Chicago, Illinois, a neighborhood
 Hyde Park Township, Cook County, Illinois, annexed by Chicago in 1889
 Hyde Park, Boston, Massachusetts
 Hyde Park Township, Wabasha County, Minnesota
 Hyde Park, Kansas City, Missouri
 Hyde Park, St. Louis, Missouri
 Hyde Park, New Mexico
 Hyde Park, Cincinnati, Ohio
 Woodbourne-Hyde Park, Ohio
 Hyde Park, Pennsylvania, borough in Westmoreland County
 Hyde Park, Berks County, Pennsylvania
 Hyde Park (Hato Rey), a subbarrio of Hato Rey Sur, San Juan, Puerto Rico
 Hyde Park, Memphis, Tennessee
 Hyde Park (Austin, Texas)
 Hyde Park, Montrose, Houston, Texas
 Hyde Park, Utah
 Hyde Park (Augusta, Georgia)

New York
 Hyde Park, New York, town in Dutchess County, New York, hometown of Franklin D. Roosevelt
 Hyde Park (CDP), New York, a hamlet and census-designated place (CDP) in the town of Hyde Park
 Hyde Park (hamlet), New York, a hamlet in Otsego County, New York
 New Hyde Park, New York, Long Island

Vermont
 Hyde Park (town), Vermont
 Hyde Park (village), Vermont
 North Hyde Park, Vermont

Other countries
 Hyde Park, Guyana, in the Demerara-Mahaica Region
 Hyde Park, Gauteng, South Africa
 Hyde Park, Belgrade, Serbia

Grounds
Hyde Park, Glasgow, a former football ground in Glasgow, Scotland
Dr. Hyde Park, a Gaelic Games ground in Roscommon, Ireland
Hyde Park (cricket ground), a former important cricket venue in Sheffield
Hyde Park (Niagara Falls, New York), a park in Niagara Falls, New York
Hyde Park (Burkeville, Virginia), a historic home and farm

Schools
 Hyde Park Career Academy, Chicago, Illinois, United States
 Hyde Park High School (South Africa)
 Hyde Park Junior School, United Kingdom
 Hyde Park Baptist High School, Austin, Texas, United States
 Hyde Park Middle School, Las Vegas, Nevada, United States

Other uses
 Hyde Park (play), by James Shirley
 Hyde Park (1934 film), a British comedy film
 Hyde Park (2017 film), an independent Western film
 Hyde Park Movement Party, Thailand
 Hyde Park Diggers, London hippie movement and commune co-founded by Sid Rawle
 Hyde Park Theatre, an arts center in Austin, Texas
 Hyde Park (Osnabrück), a music venue

See also
 Heide Park, a theme park in Soltau, Lower Saxony, Germany
 Gunfight at Hide Park 
 Hyde Park on Hudson, a 2012 British film starring Bill Murray
 Hyde Park station (disambiguation)